Tecuya Mountain in southern Kern County, California, more than  high, is the highest point on the Tecuya Ridge of the San Emigdio Mountains in the Transverse Ranges.

References 

San Emigdio Mountains
Mountains of Kern County, California
Mountains of Southern California